, also known as Fish and Swordsmanship and Sakanaya Kenpo, is a 1929 Japanese film directed by Shuichi Yamashita.

Cast
 Ensho Jitsukawa
 Dojuro Kataoka
 Akane Hisano

References

External links 
 

Japanese black-and-white films
Japanese silent films
1929 films